
Gmina Oleszyce is an urban-rural gmina (administrative district) in Lubaczów County, Subcarpathian Voivodeship, in south-eastern Poland.

Villages
Apart from the town of Oleszyce, Gmina Oleszyce contains the villages and settlements of Borchów, Futory, Nowa Grobla, Stare Oleszyce and Stare Sioło.

Neighbouring gminas
Gmina Oleszyce is bordered by the gminas of Laszki and Wiązownica.

References

Polish official population figures 2006

Oleszyce
Lubaczów County